Hans Ernst Schneider (4 February 1927 – 14 October 2014) was a Swiss sprinter. He competed in the men's 400 metres at the 1952 Summer Olympics.

References

1927 births
2014 deaths
Athletes (track and field) at the 1952 Summer Olympics
Swiss male sprinters
Olympic athletes of Switzerland
Place of birth missing